Encore is a 2008 album by violinist David Garrett, released in Europe. Its tracks are as follows:

Track listing 
 "Smooth Criminal" (Michael Jackson)
 "Who Wants to Live Forever?" (Queen)
 "Clair de Lune" (Claude Debussy)
 "He's a Pirate" (Pirates of the Caribbean theme)
 "Summertime" (George Gershwin)
 "Hungarian Dance No. 5" (Johannes Brahms)
 "Chelsea Girl" (David Garrett and Franck van der Heijden)
 "Summer" (Antonio Vivaldi)
 "O Mio Babbino Caro"  (Giacomo Puccini)
 "Air" (J.S. Bach)
 "Thunderstruck" (AC/DC)
 "New Day" (David Garrett and Franck van der Heijden)
 "Ain't No Sunshine" (Bill Withers)
 "Rock Prelude" (David Garrett and Franck van der Heijden)
 "Winter Lullaby" (David Garrett and Franck van der Heijden)
 "Zorba's Dance" (from the film Zorba the Greek)

Charts

Weekly charts

Year-end charts

Certifications

References

2008 albums
David Garrett (musician) albums